Blue Hats is an album by the American jazz group Yellowjackets, released in 1997. The album reached a peak position of number nine on Billboard Top Contemporary Jazz Albums chart.

Track listing

Personnel 
 Russell Ferrante – acoustic piano, synthesizers 
 Jimmy Haslip – 5-string basses, 6-string and 7-string fretless basses
 Will Kennedy – drums
 Bob Mintzer – soprano saxophone, tenor saxophone, bass clarinet, EWI

Production 
 Yellowjackets – producers 
 Rich Breen – recording
 Troy Gonzales – recording assistant 
 Malcolm Pollack – mixing 
 Brett Swain – mix assistant 
 Greg Calbi – mastering 
 Sally Poppy – production coordinator, management 
 Margi Denton – art direction, design
 Caroline Greyshock – photography
 Gary Borman – management
 Recorded at Sony Music Studios (Santa Monica, California)
 Mixed at O'Henry Sound Studios (Burbank, California)
 Mastered at Masterdisk (New York City, New York)

Charts

References

1997 albums
Yellowjackets albums
Warner Records albums
Instrumental albums